A special election was held in  on August 25, 1800 to fill a vacancy left by William Gordon (F) resigning to accept an appointment as New Hampshire Attorney General on June 12, 1800.

Election results
New Hampshire electoral law required a majority for election, which was not met on the first ballot, requiring a run-off election on October 27, 1800

Tenney took his seat on December 8, 1800.

See also
List of special elections to the United States House of Representatives
 United States House of Representatives election in New Hampshire, 1800
 United States House of Representatives elections, 1800 and 1801

References

New Hampshire 1800 at-large
New Hampshire 1800 at-large
1800 at-large
New Hampshire at-large
United States House of Representatives at-large
United States House of Representatives 1800 at-large